The following is a list of all team-to-team transactions that have occurred in the National Hockey League during the 1968–69 NHL season. It lists what team each player has been traded to, signed by, or claimed by, and for which player(s) or draft pick(s), if applicable.

Trades between teams

May

Notes
 Trade completed in June, 1968 (exact date unknown).

June 

Notes
 Trade completed on May 25, 1971.
 Trade completed in September, 1968 (exact date unknown).

July

August

September

October

November

December

January

February

Notes
 Trade completed in June 1969 (exact date unknown).

March

References

Additional sources
 hockeydb.com - search for player and select "show trades"
 

Transactions
National Hockey League transactions